Bryant Wallizer (born 6 April 1987) is an American rifle shooter. He won a bronze medal in the 10 m air rifle at the 2015 Pan American Games.

Wallizer was born to Pat and Donna Wallizer and has one sister; he is married to Morgan Wallizer. He has a degree in environmental protection from the West Virginia University.

References

1987 births
Living people
American male sport shooters
Shooters at the 2015 Pan American Games
People from Allegany County, Maryland
Pan American Games medalists in shooting
Pan American Games bronze medalists for the United States
West Virginia Mountaineers rifle shooters
Murray State Racers rifle shooters
Medalists at the 2015 Pan American Games